Kurdistan Alliance may refer to:
 Democratic Patriotic Alliance of Kurdistan, the main Kurdish list in the 2005 Iraqi election
 Kurdistani List, a Kurdish election list in Iraq since 2009